Meghann Shaughnessy was the defending champion, but lost in the second round to Marie-Gaïané Mikaelian.

Elena Bovina won the title, defeating Mikaelian 6–3, 6–4 in the final.

Seeds

Draw

Finals

Top half

Bottom half

References
Main Draw and Qualifying Draw

Challenge Bell
Tournoi de Québec
Can